This is a list of ambassadors of Israel to the Lao People's Democratic Republic.

List of ambassadors

Minister Daniel Lewin (diplomat) (Non-Resident, Naypyitaw) 1957–1960
Ambassador Mordecai Kidron (Non-Resident, Bangkok) 1958–1963
Shimon Avimor (Non-Resident, Phnom Penh) 1972–1975
Nadav Eshcar (Non-Resident, Hanoi) 2017–present

References 

Laos
Israel